Matthew Joseph Carasiti (born July 23, 1991) is an American professional baseball pitcher in the Colorado Rockies organization.  He was drafted by the Colorado Rockies in the sixth round as the 194th pick in the 2012 Major League Baseball draft, and made his Major League Baseball (MLB) debut in 2018. He has played in MLB for the Rockies and Seattle Mariners, and in Nippon Professional Baseball (NPB) for the Tokyo Yakult Swallows.

Early life
Born in New Britain, Connecticut, and raised in East Berlin, Connecticut, Carasiti graduated from Berlin High School, where he was a standout baseball pitcher. Carasiti was originally drafted out of high school by the Texas Rangers in the 36th round (1084 overall) of the 2009 Major League Baseball Draft.

Carasiti declined the offer and accepted a baseball scholarship to St. John's University in Queens, New York. In 2011, he played collegiate summer baseball in the Cape Cod Baseball League for the Yarmouth-Dennis Red Sox. Carasiti helped St. John's win its record seventh 2012 Big East Conference baseball tournament with a 7–3 championship game victory against USF on May 27, 2012.  Carasiti was named the Tournament Most Outstanding Player, earning the win in two of his team's four games.

Professional career

Colorado Rockies 
On June 5, 2012, Carasiti was drafted by the Colorado Rockies in the sixth round as the 194th pick in the 2012 Major League Baseball draft.

In 2016, most of which he pitched for the Hartford Yard Goats for whom he was 0–2 with a 2.31 ERA with a league-leading 29 saves, he was named a mid-season Eastern League All Star, a post-season All Star, and an MiLB.com Organization All Star.

Carasiti was called up by the Rockies on August 12, 2016, making his MLB debut the same day pitching 2 innings in relief in the Rockies 10–6 loss to the Philadelphia Phillies. On December 15, 2016, Carasiti signed a minor league contract with the Rockies that included an invitation to 2017 spring training.

Chicago Cubs 
In 2017 he was named a mid-season Pacific Coast League All Star. On June 26, 2017, Carasiti was traded to the Chicago Cubs for Zac Rosscup. He had his contract purchased on November 6, 2017, but was released on December 1 to pursue playing in Japan.

Tokyo Yakult Swallows 
On December 5, 2017, Carasiti signed with the Tokyo Yakult Swallows of Nippon Professional Baseball (NPB). He became a free agent following the 2018 season.

Chicago Cubs (second stint) 
On January 2, 2019, Carasiti signed a minor league deal with the Chicago Cubs. With the AAA Iowa Cubs in the Pacific Coast League he was 1–1 with one save and a 2.67 ERA in 16 relief appearances covering 27 innings. He was released on June 7, 2019.

Seattle Mariners 
On June 7, 2019, shortly following his release from the Cubs organization, Carasiti signed a minor league contract with the Seattle Mariners. On June 23, his contract was selected. With the Mariners, he was 0–1 with a 4.66 ERA in 9.2 innings in which he struck out 10 batters in 11 games (5 starts). With the Tacoma Raniers of the Pacific Coast League, he was 1–0 with a 4.96 ERA in 15 relief appearances in which he pitched 16.1 innings and struck out 17 batters. On September 8, he was outrighted off the 40-man roster. He became a free agent following the 2019 season.

San Francisco Giants 
On January 5, 2020, the Giants signed Carasiti to a minor league contract with an invitation to spring training. Carasiti was released by the Giants in March 2020 after undergoing Tommy John surgery.

Boston Red Sox
On January 26, 2021, Carasiti signed a minor league contract with the Boston Red Sox organization that included an invitation to spring training. He was assigned to the Triple-A Worcester Red Sox, and began the season on the injured list. Carasiti did not appear in a game in 2021, and became a free agent following the season.

San Francisco Giants (second stint)
On January 27, 2022, Carasiti signed a minor league contract with the San Francisco Giants. He was released on July 18, 2022.

Long Island Ducks
On August 13, 2022, Carasiti signed with the Long Island Ducks of the Atlantic League of Professional Baseball.

Colorado Rockies (second stint)
On December 21, 2022, Carasiti signed a minor league deal with the Colorado Rockies.

References

External links

1991 births
Living people
Albuquerque Isotopes players
American expatriate baseball players in Japan
Asheville Tourists players
Baseball players from Connecticut
Colorado Rockies players
Tokyo Yakult Swallows players
Seattle Mariners players
Grand Junction Rockies players
Hartford Yard Goats players
Iowa Cubs players
Major League Baseball pitchers
Modesto Nuts players
Nippon Professional Baseball pitchers
Salt River Rafters players
Sportspeople from New Britain, Connecticut
St. John's Red Storm baseball players
Tacoma Rainiers players
Yarmouth–Dennis Red Sox players